Kapel is a hamlet in the Dutch province of North Holland. It is located in the municipality of Heiloo, about 2 km south of Heiloo itself.

The hamlet is named after the chapel of "Onze Lieve Vrouwe ter Nood", a pilgrimage site since 1409. Formerly, it was also known as Oesdom.

References

Populated places in North Holland